Tyra Perry is an American, former collegiate softball outfielder and current head coach originally from Zachary, Louisiana. She began playing for the Nicholls State Colonels from 1994-95 and ended with the LSU Tigers from 1997-98. She is currently leading Illinois Fighting Illini softball.

Coaching career

Ball State
On August 6, 2013, Perry was named the head coach at Ball State.

Illinois
On June 24, 2015, Perry was named the head coach at Illinois.

Career statistics

Head coaching record

College
References:

References

Living people
Softball players from Louisiana
Female sports coaches
American softball coaches
Nicholls Colonels softball players
LSU Tigers softball players
Birmingham–Southern Panthers softball coaches
Western Kentucky Lady Toppers softball coaches
Ball State Cardinals softball coaches
Illinois Fighting Illini softball coaches
Year of birth missing (living people)